Tom Melvin (born October 1, 1961) is an American football coach who is the tight ends coach for the Kansas City Chiefs of the National Football League (NFL). His cousin, Bob Melvin, is manager of the San Diego Padres.

Playing career

Early years
Melvin attended Ellwood P. Cubberley High School in Palo Alto, California and lettered in football and soccer. He graduated from Cubberley High School in 1979.

College
Melvin attended San Francisco State University, where he played football as an offensive lineman. He graduated with a bachelor's degree in physical education.  He earned a master's degree in educational administration while he coached at Northern Arizona University.

Coaching career

College
Melvin's first coaching job was as a graduate assistant at San Francisco State University.  He then coached at Northern Arizona University, where he tutored tight end Shawn Collins.

After this, he coached at University of California, Santa Barbara.  UCSB's offense was ranked fifth during Melvin's tenure in 1989, and Melvin coached five All-America selections.

Following UCSB, Melvin coached at Occidental College for eight years, as offensive coordinator and offensive line coach.

Professional
In 1999, Melvin joined the Philadelphia Eagles coaching staff, serving for three seasons as the offensive assistant/quality control coach before moving to his current position as tight ends coach. In 2019, Melvin won his first Super Bowl when the Chiefs defeated the San Francisco 49ers 31-20 in Super Bowl LIV. In 2022, Melvin won his second Super Bowl when the Chiefs defeated the Philadelphia Eagles 38-35 in Super Bowl LVII.

References

External links
Philadelphia Eagles bio

1961 births
Living people
Kansas City Chiefs coaches
Northern Arizona University alumni
People from Redwood City, California
Philadelphia Eagles coaches
San Francisco State University alumni